"Gots ta Be" is the second single by R&B group B2K off their self-titled debut album. The song was released in February 26, 2002 and it peaked at number 17 on the Billboard Hot 100 and number 13 on the Hot R&B/Hip-Hop Songs.

Music video
The video was directed by Dave Meyers. It was released on iTunes on April 28, 2003.

Formats and track listing
US 12"
A1. "Gots Ta Be" (Radio Edit) – 4:17
A2. "Gots Ta Be" (Instrumental) – 5:22
A3. "Gots Ta Be" (Acappella) – 5:03
B1. "Gots Ta Be" (Remix) (featuring Nazkar) – :56
B2. "Gots Ta Be" (Album Version) – 5:21
B3. "Gots Ta Be" (Instrumental) – 5:22
US 12" promo (remixes)
A1. "Gots Ta Be" (Clue/Duro Remix) – 4:17
A2. "Gots Ta Be" (Platinum Status Remix) – 2:57
A3. "Gots Ta Be" (Allegro Love Remix) – 3:44
B1. "Gots Ta Be" (Clue/Duro Remix Instrumental) – 4:17
B2. "Gots Ta Be" (Platinum Status Remix Instrumental) – 2:57
B3. "Gots Ta Be" (Allegro Love Remix Instrumental) – 3:44
US promo CD
1. "Gots Ta Be" (Radio Edit) – 4:17
2. "Gots Ta Be" (Instrumental) – 5:22
3. "Gots Ta Be" (Acappella) – 5:03
4. "Gots Ta Be" (Call Out Hook) – 0:15

Weekly charts

Year-end charts

References

2001 songs
2002 singles
2000s ballads
B2K songs
Epic Records singles
Contemporary R&B ballads
Song recordings produced by the Underdogs (production team)
Songs written by Harvey Mason Jr.
Songs written by Damon Thomas (record producer)
Music videos directed by Dave Meyers (director)